Rosemary S. Hails  is a British population ecologist and entomologist and the current Director of Science and Nature at the National Trust for Places of Historic Interest or Natural Beauty. In 2000, she was made a Member of the Most Excellent Order of the British Empire (MBE) for services to environmental research.

References

External links 
 

Living people
Date of birth missing (living people)
Fellows of the Royal Society of Biology
Members of the Order of the British Empire
British ecologists
Fellows of the Royal Entomological Society
Year of birth missing (living people)
Women ecologists
20th-century British scientists
20th-century British women scientists
21st-century British scientists
21st-century British women scientists
Alumni of the University of Oxford
British entomologists
Women entomologists